The 1997 Big East men's basketball tournament took place at Madison Square Garden in New York City. Its winner received the Big East Conference's automatic bid to the 1997 NCAA tournament. It is a single-elimination tournament with four rounds and the three highest seeds received byes in the first round. All 13 Big East teams were invited to participate. Boston College and Villanova finished with the best record in the regular season.  After tie-breakers, Villanova was awarded the top seed.

Boston College defeated Villanova in the final, 70–58 to earn its first Big East tournament championship.  Future NFL quarterback Donovan McNabb participated in the tournament as a reserve forward for Syracuse.

Bracket

Awards
Dave Gavitt Trophy (Most Outstanding Player): Scoonie Penn, Boston College

All-Tournament Team
 Danya Abrams, Boston College
 Victor Page, Georgetown
 Scoonie Penn, Boston College
 Tim Thomas, Villanova
 Alvin Williams, Villanova
 Duane Woodward, Boston College

References
General:  

Tournament
Big East men's basketball tournament
Basketball in New York City
College sports in New York City
Sports competitions in New York City
Sports in Manhattan
Big East men's basketball tournament
Big East men's basketball tournament
1990s in Manhattan
Madison Square Garden